Lianhe may refer to:

 Lianhe Zaobao (联合早报), Singapore-based Chinese-language newspaper
 Lianhe Subdistrict, Guangzhou (联和街道), in Luogang District, Guangzhou, China
 Lianhe Subdistirct, Hengyang (联合街道), in Zhengxiang District, Hengyang, Hunan, China
 Lianhe, Wulipu, Shayang, Jingmen, Hubei, China